Chi Boötis, Latinised as χ Boötis, is a single, white-hued star in the northern constellation Boötes, near the eastern constellation border with Corona Borealis. It is faintly visible to the naked eye with an apparent visual magnitude of +5.3. The star is moving closer to the Sun with a radial velocity of −16 km/s.

This is an A-type main-sequence star with a stellar classification of A2 V, which indicates it is generating energy via hydrogen fusion at its core. It is about 340 million years old with a projected rotational velocity of 84 km/s.

References

External links
 

A-type main-sequence stars
Circumstellar disks
Boötes
Bootis, Chi
BD+29 2640
Bootis, 48
135502
074596
5676